La Sufricaya is an archaeological site of the pre-Columbian Maya civilization, located in the Petén Basin region of present-day Guatemala.

Teotihuacano-style imagery found on stelae and murals at the site are suggestive of foreign (i.e., non-Maya) presence, or even occupation, although much of the site's extent and historical relationships are yet to be fully excavated and analysed.

References
 
 
 
 
 

 

Sufricaya, La
Archaeological sites in Guatemala
Former populated places in Guatemala